The 12557 / 12558 Sapt Kranti Superfast Express is a Superfast train service of Indian Railways running between Muzaffarpur railway station and Anand Vihar Terminal railway station. This train is operated by the East Central Railway zone of Indian Railways. Its inaugural run was on 1 July 2002. Its terminal station was changed from New Delhi railway station to Anand Vihar Terminal from 2 December 2010. But from 15 June 2020 to 5 December 2020 it would be run from Old Delhi to Muzaffarpur due to COVID-19 pandemic. One rake of this train got Gandhi theme coaches. This train got LHB coach on 2 October 2019 to celebrate 150th birthday of Mahatama Gandhi  The train has its name based on the Sapt Kranti movement led by Ram Manohar Lohia. It is an ISO 9001:2008 certified Train.

Service
This train runs daily and covers a distance of 1059 km. This train consists of coaches of type, AC 1st Class, AC 2 Tier, AC 3 Tier, Sleeper, Second sitting (II) Unreserved, General and a pantry car. This train is generally reserved well ahead of its departure dates.

From October 2019, LHB coach replaced the old ICF coach for the comfort of the passengers. The train is now hauled by the Indian locomotive class WAP-7 through its entire journey.

Route & halts

Locomotive
Both trains are hauled by a Ghaziabad / Tughlakabad-based WAP-7 (HOG)-equipped locomotive on its entire journey.

See also

 Express trains in India
 Bhopal Express
 Taj Express
 List of named passenger trains of India
 Indian Railways coaching stock

References

 Indian Railways website

Transport in Muzaffarpur
Transport in Delhi
Named passenger trains of India
Rail transport in Bihar
Rail transport in Delhi
Rail transport in Uttar Pradesh
Railway services introduced in 2010
Express trains in India